Knockout is an Indonesian television game show which was adopted from the merger of two programs: Boxing Gloves and Face It, and was produced by FremantleMedia for Indosiar. Boxing Glove itself is the latest edition of the game show Hole in the Wall that was shown in RCTI and Global TV. This show is aired every Wednesday-Friday: 4:00 pm. The hosts are John Martin and Nabila Putri.

References

Indonesian television series
2010s Indonesian television series
2010s game shows
Indonesian game shows